Moray  or ) is one of the 32 local government council areas of Scotland. It lies in the north-east of the country, with a coastline on the Moray Firth, and borders the council areas of Aberdeenshire and Highland.

Between 1975 and 1996 Moray, with similar boundaries, was a district of the then Grampian Region.

History
Welsh môr-tref).

During the Middle Ages, the Province of Moray was much larger than the modern council area, also covering much of what is now Highland and Aberdeenshire. During this period Moray may for a time have been either an independent kingdom or a highly autonomous vassal of Alba. In the early 12th century, Moray was defeated by David I of Scotland following a conflict with Óengus of Moray, and rule over the area was passed to William fitz Duncan.

After that the title became defunct until the 14th century when Thomas Randolph was granted the title Earl of Moray. The earldom became extinct and was recreated four times: with its last creation surviving to the present day, currently being held by the 21st Earl of Moray. Over these centuries, the territory of the County of Moray contracted to the area around Elgin.

The boundaries of the Moray Council area date from the Local Government (Scotland) Act 1973 and the subsequent reorganisation of local government in Scotland in 1975. The area was a district of the Grampian Region between 1975 and 1996, when the regions were abolished and Moray became a unitary authority. The council area covers most of the historic county of Moray (the rest is part of the Highland council area) along with most of historic Banffshire (the rest is part of the Aberdeenshire council area). Another set of boundaries — similar to those of the historic county — are used as a lieutenancy area and as a registration county.

Politics 
The Moray Council currently has 26 members, elected using the single transferable vote in eight wards.  the council is controlled by a minority SNP administration.

Moray's boundaries coincide with those of the Moray constituency of the UK House of Commons. The current MP is Douglas Ross of the Conservative Party.

For the Scottish Parliament, the majority of Moray is in the Moray constituency and the Highlands and Islands electoral region. The eastern corner of Moray (consisting of the Buckie ward and the eastern part of the Keith and Cullen ward) is instead in the Banffshire and Buchan Coast constituency and the North-East Scotland electoral region.

In the 2014 Scottish independence referendum, Moray voted, 'No' by an above-average percentage of 57.6%. In the 2016 European Union membership referendum, Moray voted, 'Remain' by a 50.1% margin. It had the biggest percentage for, 'Leave' out of all the Scottish council areas and the narrowest margin of victory for either side anywhere in the UK.

Towns and villages 
The large majority of Moray's population live in the northern part of the district; only one of its eight wards covers the glens to the south. Elgin is by far the largest town, being home to 25% of the population at the 2011 census.

 Aberlour
 Alves
 Archiestown
 Arradoul
 Auchenhalrig
 Bogmoor
 Boharm
 Broadley
 Brodie
 Buckie
 Burghead
 Clochan
 Craigellachie
 Cullen
 Cummingston
 Dallas
 Deskford
 Dipple
 Drybridge
 Dufftown
 Duffus
 Dyke
 Elgin
 Findhorn
 Findochty
 Fochabers
 Fogwatt
 Forres
 Garmouth
 Hopeman
 Ianstown
 Inchberry
 Keith
 Kingston
 Kinloss
 Kintessack
 Lhanbryde
 Longmorn
 Lossiemouth
 Mill of Tynet
 Mosstodloch
 Nether Dallachy
 Newmill
 Ordiquish
 Portgordon
 Portknockie
 Rathven
 Rafford
 Rothes
 Rothiemay
 Spey Bay
 Tomintoul
 Unthank
 Upper Dallachy
 Urquhart

Education

There are 45 primary and eight secondary schools in Moray and the council currently has responsibility for educating more than 13,000 pupils. The council's community learning and development team is also involved in arranging a wide range of classes and courses for adult learners. The council also currently operates 15 public libraries, all with free internet and e-mail access, and two mobile libraries which service users in more remote areas.

Moray is also home to the University of the Highlands and Islands affiliated Moray College, and to Gordonstoun independent boarding school and its accompanying preparatory school, Aberlour House.

Infrastructure

Moray Council is also responsible for the maintenance of 1,000 miles of roads, 450 miles of footpaths, 468 bridges, 16,000 street lights and 10,500 road signs.

As a housing authority, Moray Council manages nearly 6,000 council properties and operates a council house waiting list. It also provides housing which has been specially designed, built, or adapted to meet the requirements of certain groups such as the elderly and those with special needs. The council's development control section, which is part of the environmental services department, deals with thousands of planning applications every year from individuals and organisations seeking permission to erect buildings or adapt existing ones.

Drug issue 
In 2020, Scotland had the highest number of drug-related deaths in Europe, almost 3.5 times higher than the rest of the UK.

Figures from the National Records of Scotland show there were 17 drug deaths in the Moray area in 2018 compared to 7 the year before. That compares to 10 in both 2016 and 2015, 2 in 2014 and 5 in 2013. The 2018 figures for the Moray area were the highest since records began in 1996, mirroring the national picture.

In 2019, 12 drug-related deaths were reported - 5 fewer than the record high of the previous year. This represents a drug-related death rate per 1,000 people of 0.12. By comparison, the death rate in neighbouring Aberdeenshire per 1,000 people was 0.08; in Dundee it was 0.36 (the highest in the country); in Glasgow it was 0.35 (the second highest in the country); the lowest in Scotland was Orkney with a rate of 0.06.

Environment

Approximately 50,000 tonnes of waste is collected from homes and commercial properties in Moray. Households in many communities benefit from a kerbside recycling service. There are over 60 recycling points located throughout Moray in addition to eight larger recycling centres.

Economy

Employment
The working population of Moray in 2003 was nearly 40,000: of whom around 34,000 were employees and 6000 self-employed. Of these 34,000, 31% were employed in the public sector, compared with 27% for Scotland and 25% for the UK (the RAF personnel are not included in these figures). Only 18% of jobs are managerial or professional, compared to 25% for Scotland.

Economic performance and development
The gross value added (GVA) in Moray was £1.26 billion, in 2003. This corresponds to an output of £14,500 per resident and was 6% below the average for Scotland and 12% below that of the UK.

The diagrams show the strong reliance on the food and drink industry i.e. the distilling, canned food and biscuit manufacturing industries. The public sector is also very prominent. Of the total GVA of £1.26 billion, food and drink is responsible for 19% while 3% is the Scottish figure and 2% for the UK. Moray is responsible for 9% of the entire food and drink GVA of Scotland. Significant areas where Moray has a larger than average share of national markets are in tourism, forest products, textiles and specialised metal working. In contrast, however, Moray is significantly underrepresented in the business services area at 15% of GVA while it is 19% for Scotland and 25% for the UK.

In March 2014 a tourism strategy was launched by the Moray Economic Partnership aimed at doubling the £95m industry over the next decade. In June 2014 a website (morayspeyside.com) was launched under the auspices of the Moray Chamber of Commerce to support the strategy and provide a one-stop shop for visitors.

Earnings
Compared to Scottish or British levels, average incomes in Moray are low.  The average wage in 2003 was £286 per week, which was 12% below the Scottish average and 18% below the British (these statistics exclude the armed forces). These figures reflect the large amount of part-time employment, with fewer qualified workers and less managerial and professional jobs. 16% of residents commute outwards, which is relatively high. Of these, two-thirds work in Aberdeen or Aberdeenshire, mainly in the oil and gas industry. These outward commuters earn significantly more than local workers.

Business base
In 2004, there were around 2,500 VAT registered businesses in Moray, with 75% of businesses employing fewer than five people and about half of firms with a turnover of less than £100,000. 60% of employees are employed in small firms, compared to 48% for Scotland as a whole.

Moray's major companies export their products to other British regions and abroad and many of the smaller companies have direct involvement with neighbouring economies in Aberdeen, Aberdeenshire and Highland.  Also, a large outward-commuting workforce (estimated to be in excess of 5,000 people) derives its income from the neighbouring centres of Aberdeen and Inverness.

Population
An inhabitant of Moray, especially the historic Mormaer of Moray, is called, 'Moravian.'

Language
The first records on language use in the area indicate that in 1705, most of Moray except for the coast was described as "Wholly Irish & Highland Countreys" and "Ye Irish Parishes in which both languages are spoken." By 1822, Scottish Gaelic had weakened in the area, with only the far south of Moray reporting that, at best, 10% of the population were speaking Gaelic better than English. Records towards the end of the 19th century improved and show that between 1881 and 1921 the percentage of Gaelic speakers in Moray fluctuated as shown in the following table:

Since then, it has been consistently below 1%. It was largely replaced by Doric and latterly Scottish English.

See also

 2007 Moray Council election

Notes

References
 A joint report HIE Moray and Moray Council, entitled "Moray 2020: Strategy for the Diversification of the Economy of Moray Following Restructuring of the RAF Bases at Kinloss and Lossiemouth", is available at both web sites.

External links

Moray Council
Moray Speyside Tourism, the official tourism website for Moray

Undiscovered Speyside Community Web Site, a portal for all things Speyside
Moray and Speyside info

 
Politics of Moray
Districts of Scotland
Highlands and Islands of Scotland
Council areas of Scotland
Grampian